Poland men's national field hockey team represents Poland in international field hockey and is controlled by the Polish field hockey association, or in Polish: Polski Związek Hokeja na Trawie, also known as PZHT.

Tournament record

Summer Olympics

Friendship Games

World Cup

European Championships

EuroHockey Championship

EuroHockey Championship II

Hockey World League

*Draws include knockout matches decided on a penalty shoot-out.

Current squad
The following 18 players were named on 13 October 2021 for the 2021 European World Cup Qualifier in Cardiff, Wales.

Head coach: Dariusz Rachwalski

Caps updated as of 24 October 2021, after the match against Italy.

See also
Poland women's national field hockey team

References

External links
Official website

European men's national field hockey teams
Field hockey
National team
Men's sport in Poland